Cory is a small unincorporated community within the boundaries of the incorporated town of Orchard City in Delta County, Colorado, United States. There is a U.S. Post Office in Cory, the ZIP Code for which is 81414.

A post office called Cory has been in operation since 1895. An early postmaster gave the community the name of his wife, Cora Hurshman.

Geography
Cory is located at  (38.788078,-107.985477).

See also
 List of cities and towns in Colorado

References

Unincorporated communities in Delta County, Colorado
Unincorporated communities in Colorado